Lucas Ludwig (born 30 August 1989) is a former German Paralympic swimmer who competed in international level events. He is a double European champion and a World bronze medalist, he has competed at the Paralympic Games twice but did not medal in his events.

References

External links
 

1989 births
Living people
German male backstroke swimmers
German male butterfly swimmers
German male freestyle swimmers
German male medley swimmers
Paralympic swimmers of Germany
S10-classified Paralympic swimmers
Swimmers at the 2008 Summer Paralympics
Swimmers at the 2012 Summer Paralympics
Medalists at the World Para Swimming Championships
Medalists at the World Para Swimming European Championships
Sportspeople from Cottbus